Adel Humoud (born 20 June 1986) is a Kuwaiti footballer who is a midfielder.

References

1986 births
Living people
Kuwaiti footballers
Footballers at the 2006 Asian Games
Sportspeople from Kuwait City
Association football midfielders
Qadsia SC players
Kuwait international footballers
Asian Games competitors for Kuwait
Al-Nasr SC (Kuwait) players
Muscat Club players
NK Jedinstvo Bihać players
Al Jahra SC players
Al-Shamal SC players
Qatar Stars League players
Kuwait Premier League players
Kuwaiti expatriate footballers
Oman Professional League players
Expatriate footballers in Oman
Expatriate footballers in Qatar
Expatriate footballers in Bosnia and Herzegovina
Kuwaiti expatriate sportspeople in Oman
Kuwaiti expatriate sportspeople in Qatar
Kuwaiti expatriate sportspeople in Bosnia and Herzegovina